Muḥkam and Mutashābih are Arabic words that are used in the Qurʾān. Muhkam can be translated as "decisive" and Mutashabih as "allegorical".

Quranic passage 
"He it is Who has revealed the Book to you; some of its verses are decisive (Muhkam), they are the basis of the Book, and others are allegorical (Mutashabih); then as for those in whose hearts there is perversity they follow the part of it which is allegorical, seeking to mislead and seeking to give it (their own) interpretation. but none knows its interpretation except Allah, and those who are firmly rooted in knowledge say: We believe in it, it is all from our Lord; and none do mind except those having understanding."

Commentary 
It was reported from ʿAlī that he stated, "[Those rooted in knowledge] are the ones whom knowledge has protected from plunging [into the interpretation of the Qurʾān] according to some whim (hawā) or with set arguments (ḥujaj maḍrūba) without [awareness of] the unseen [mysteries] (ghuyūb)."

See also

 Those firmly rooted in knowledge

Notes

Quranic exegesis
Arabic words and phrases